The 2008 Major League Soccer All-Star Game was the 13th annual MLS All-Star Game. The MLS All-Stars faced West Ham United of the English Premier League. The game was played on July 24, 2008, with the MLS winning 3–2. New England Revolution coach Steve Nicol coached the All-Stars. The motto for the 2008 MLS All-Star Game is "Major League Soccer Takes on the World." Chicago Fire's Cuauhtémoc Blanco was named MVP.

Host venue
MLS Commissioner Don Garber awarded the 2008 All-Star Game to Toronto, Ontario in 2007 on the eve of the 2007 MLS All-Star Game. The game was played in the new soccer-specific stadium, BMO Field and was the first MLS All-Star Game held in Canada. BMO Field is home to the MLS' 13th franchise, Toronto FC.

West Ham United

On April 4, 2008, the Major League Soccer website announced that Premier League club West Ham United would be the fifth international opponent for the marquee event. Founded in 1895, the east London club was originally called Thames Ironworks FC but switched to West Ham United five years later and has been playing at the Boleyn Ground since 1904. West Ham has forged a reputation of cultivating some of the England's top players, such as Frank Lampard, Michael Carrick, Rio Ferdinand, and Joe Cole, giving rise to its frequent reference as The Academy of Football.

MLS All-Stars

Voting
Major League Soccer released an official ballot to decide the players called to represent the league in the All-Star game. A four-tier voting system determined the First XI players selected for the game. The online fan balloting program comprised 25% of the total vote, with coaches and general managers (25%), players (25%), and media (25%) combining for the remaining 75% percent of the vote. The combined vote of the four groups determined the MLS First XI.

2008 All-Star Game Squads

Major League Soccer
Major League Soccer and Toronto FC, hosts of the 2008 Pepsi MLS All-Star Game, unveiled the MLS All-Star First XI in a press conference aired live exclusively on MLSnet.com from BMO Field on Thursday, July 10 at 11 am ET. In addition to the First XI, Commissioner Don Garber picked two more players for the All-Star team, and coach Steve Nicol received five picks on July 15, 2008.

After the U.S. U-23 Olympic Team roster was announced, three additional picks were awarded to Steve Nicol on Thursday, July 17 to replace Michael Parkhurst, Sacha Kljestan, and Robbie Rogers. The additions included 2006 MLS Rookie of the Year Jonathan Bornstein, veteran Steve Ralston, and Colombian Juan Toja, who scored a goal in last year's All-Star Game.

As of July 19, 2008. Players in bold denotes First XI status.

~
~
~
~

~

~
†
†
~

~

♦
♦
♦
♦
♦
♦
♦
♦
♦
♦

~ – Players selected by coach

† – "Commissioner's Picks"

♦ – Inactive

MLS All-Star Head Coach – Steve Nicol

West Ham United
As of May 13, 2008.

Match details

Notes
The 2008 Major League Soccer All-Star Game was the first to be played in Canada.
For the first time Pepsi was the official sponsor of the All-Star Game. Previously, Sierra Mist, a Pepsi brand, was the advertised sponsor.
This was the fifth time that the league's best players faced international competition in the MLS All-Star Game.
For the second consecutive year New England Revolution coach Steve Nicol was the head coach for the MLS side.
Former CBC affiliate, then E! and now CityTV affiliate CHAT-TV in Medicine Hat, Alberta did not air the game, because of Calgary CBC station CBRT-TV, as well as online through live streaming on the CBC sports website.

References

MLS All-Star Game
Soccer in Toronto
Mls All-Star Game
All-Star Game
Sports competitions in Toronto
Mls All-Star Game
Mls All-Star Game
Mls All-Star Game